Kenneth Wable (August 22, 1927 – September 6, 2018) was an American football player and coach. He served as the head football coach at Mount Union University in Alliance, Ohio from 1962 to 1985.

Beginning in 1979, Wable began a streak of consecutive winning seasons that persists to this day.

Head coaching record

College

References

1927 births
2018 deaths
Cornell Big Red football coaches
Mount Union Purple Raiders football coaches
Muskingum Fighting Muskies football players
Muskingum Fighting Muskies football coaches
Wake Forest Demon Deacons football coaches
High school football coaches in Ohio